Autódromo Ciudad de Oberá is a motor racing circuit located on the outskirts of the homonymous city, in Misiones Province, Argentina. It is a circuit that popularly receives national-level motorsport categories, possessing two circuit variants, the first (more extensive) is a  circuit, with an appendix formed by a straight with an extensive curve and a final counter-straight. The main straight and a group of locked corners close the circuit. The second variant is a  circuit, which dispenses with the appendix formed by the long curve and the final straight, leaving only the main straight and locked corners. In both cases, the direction of rotation is clockwise.

Lap records 

The official race lap records at the Autódromo Ciudad de Oberá are listed as:

References

Motorsport venues in Misiones Province